Albert Ribaucour (28 November 1845 in Lille – 13 September 1893 in Philippeville, Algeria) was a French Civil Engineer and mathematician.

Ribaucour began to study in 1865 at the Ecole Polytechnique and in 1867 at the Ecole des Ponts et Chaussées. In 1870 he started to work as an engineer at the naval base Rochefort, in 1873 in Draguignan, in 1878 in Aix-en-Provence and in 1886 in Algeria.

He is also known for his contributions to mathematics, particularly in differential geometry and minimal surfaces.

Literature

Some Works 
1870: Sur la déformation des surfaces, Comptes Rendus, 70, p. 330
1872: Note sur les développées des surfaces, Comptes Rendus, 74, p. 1399
1872: Sur la théorie des lignes de courbure, Comptes Rendus, 74, p. 1489
1872: Sur la théorie des lignes de courbure, Comptes Rendus, 74, p. 1570
1873: Sur les systèmes cycliques, Comptes Rendus, 76, p. 478
1873: Sur les faisceaux de cercles, Comptes Rendus, 76, p. 830
1880: Étude des Élassoïdes ou Surfaces A Courbure Moyenne Nulle

External links
 

1845 births
1893 deaths
19th-century French mathematicians